Automated border control systems (ABC) or eGates are automated self-service barriers which use data stored in a chip in biometric passports along with a photo or fingerprint taken at the time of entering the eGates to verify the passport holder's identity. Travellers undergo biometric verification using facial or iris recognition, fingerprints, or a combination of modalities. After the identification process is complete and the passport holder's identity is verified, a physical barrier such as a gate or turnstile opens to permit passage. If the passport holder's identification is not verified or if the system malfunctions, then the gate or turnstile does not open and an immigration officer will meet the person. E-gates came about in the mid-2000s as an automated method of reading the then-newly ICAO mandated e-passports.

All eGate systems require an e-passport that is machine readable. Some countries permit only specific nationalities to use the automated border crossing systems, e.g. EU/EEA/Swiss citizens or CAN/JPN/SGP/UK/US passport bearers, etc. For all other nationalities, citizens must go to immigration officers to be questioned and then have their passport stamped. They come in different configurations, including a gate, kiosk and gate, or mantrap kiosk, and the process for each setup is the same for departing and arriving passengers.

In the gate configuration, an incoming passenger places their passport data page either on or under a scanner, looks at a camera that will take a live picture to compare to the picture in the passport, and walks through a set of barriers that will open if the citizen's identity is verified. At either the passport scan or photo stage, if either identity cannot be verified or a malfunction happens, an immigration officer will step in at that point. Fingerprint and/or iris scans can also be taken depending on the system. In the kiosk and gate configuration, a passenger approaches a kiosk for a facial, finger and passport scan. They then proceed to a set of doors and pass through using their fingerprint. In the mantrap kiosk configuration, a passenger walks through a first set of barriers to a kiosk for a facial, finger and passport scan. They then proceed out through a second set of barriers.

The number of e-gate units deployed globally is expected to triple from 1,100 in 2013 to more than 3,200 in 2018, according to a 2014 report by Acuity Market Intelligence. Most e-gates have been deployed in airports in Europe, Australia and Asia.

Privacy issues
Automated border control systems typically collect personal information such as the information on the biometric page of the passport: name, sex, date of birth, passport number, passport photograph, nationality, and the country of origin of the passport.

Other information may also be collected, such as travel details, and the facial biometric template.

Travellers’ passport booklets are typically no longer stamped if they are processed by eGates.

Australia

SmartGate is an automated self-service border control system operated by the Australian Border Force and located at immigration checkpoints in arrival halls in eight Australian international airports. SmartGates allow Australian ePassport holders and ePassport holders of a number of other countries to clear immigration controls more rapidly, and to enhance travel security by performing passport control checks electronically. SmartGate uses facial recognition technology to verify the traveller's identity against the data stored in the chip in their biometric passport, as well as checking against immigration databases.

Travellers require a biometric passport to use SmartGate as it uses information from the passport (such as photograph, name and date of birth) and in the respective countries' databases (i.e. banned travellers database) to decide whether to grant entry or departure from Australia or to generate a referral to a customs agent.

Eligibility

Travellers are required to hold an ePassport, a valid Australian visa (except for Australian or New Zealand citizens) and complete an arrival card. The system requires travellers to look as much like their passport photo as possible, which may require removing glasses or hats when using SmartGate.

Requirements
Departing travellers, regardless of age and nationality, can use SmartGate if they have a machine-readable passport and can independently use the machine.

Arriving travellers using SmartGate must comply with more stringent conditions:
 hold a valid and current biometric passport
 are over the age of 16 (over the age of 10, if an Australian passport holder and accompanied by at least two adults) 
 hold an ePassport issued by one of the following jurisdictions:

Exceptions
There are a number of notable exceptions when entering and departing Australia and using SmartGate.

 If airline crew meet the above requirements they are also eligible to use SmartGate or they may continue to use the "crew lane".
 Australian and New Zealand citizens travelling on military orders may not use SmartGate upon arrival.
 Australian children aged 10 to 15 years (inclusive) can use SmartGate upon arrival if they are accompanied by at least two adults.

Locations
In Australia, SmartGate is available at nine international airports: Adelaide, Brisbane, Cairns, Canberra, Darwin, Gold Coast, Melbourne, Perth and Sydney.

History
The first trials of SmartGate began in 2002 with Qantas aircrews. The trials were expanded in 2004 to include over 1,000 Qantas platinum frequent flyers, and in 2007 it was launched to the public at Brisbane Airport.

Since October 2005, Australia has issued only biometric passports, called ePassports. As the validity of Australian passports do not exceed 10 years, all previous Australian passports have now expired and are now biometric.

In May 2015, the Australian Government announced that SmartGate will be launched at air and sea ports, using solely biometrics to identify and process arriving passengers, with a goal of processing 90% of air travellers automatically by 2020. The introduction of biometric arrivals, under the Seamless Traveller initiative, is expected to cost approximately AUD93.7m over 5 years and be completed by March 2019.

Canada

Most major Canadian airports use Primary Inspection Kiosks to screen returning Canadian citizens and permanent residents. These machines have meant that there is no longer a requirement at most major airports to complete a customs declaration form for returning citizens and residents. These machines have been heavily criticized by travellers as the setup of these machines creates disruptive passenger flow (as opposed to eGates elsewhere), in addition to the printing of the receipt at the end of the inspection process, negating the original intent of cutting the use of paper.

These machines take a photo, but may also require a fingerprint if the individual is not Canadian citizen.

eGates were introduced in Terminal 1 of Toronto Pearson International Airport in June 2022 as part of a pilot project with the aim of reducing delays. eGates, however, still require travellers to speak to a border officer after completing their declaration.

Members of the NEXUS program for trusted travellers may use a special lane with different requirements for identification.

European Union and Schengen Area 
The European Union funded project FastPass, one of the Seventh Framework Programs (FP7), aims to develop and demonstrate a harmonized, modular reference system for European automated border crossing points. Another FP7 project is the ABC4EU project, the primary goal of which is to make border control more flexible by enhancing the workflow and harmonizing the functionalities of ABC e-gates.

Most ABC systems in member states of the European Economic Area (EEA) (which includes all the member states of the European Union together with the EFTA states of Iceland, Liechtenstein and Norway) and in Switzerland are available for citizens of the EEA and Switzerland to use since, according to Council Regulation (EC) No 2252–2004, all passports and travel documents issued by EFTA and EU member states shall comply with minimum security standards, and passports must incorporate a storage medium (a chip) that contains the holder's facial image and fingerprints.

It was planned that, except for Denmark, Ireland and the UK (which is no longer an EU member state), EU passports would have digital imaging and fingerprint scan biometrics placed on their RFID chips. This combination of biometrics aims to create an unrivalled level of security and protection against fraudulent identification papers. Technical specifications for the new passports have been established by the European Commission. The specifications are binding for the Schengen agreement parties, i.e. the EU countries, except Ireland and the UK, and three of the four European Free Trade Association countries – Iceland, Norway and Switzerland. These countries were obliged to implement machine readable facial images in the passports by 28 August 2006, and fingerprints by 29 June 2009. According to EU requirements, only nations that are signatories to the Schengen acquis are required to add fingerprint biometrics.

Belgium
Passengers who are over 12 years old and have an electronic EU or Monaco passport can make use of the automated border control gates if they travel to a destination outside the Schengen Area.

ABC gates are available at the following locations:
 Brussels Airport

Cyprus
BorderXpress are operated by Cyprus Port and Marine Police at Larnaca International Airport and Paphos International Airport.

The gates used facial recognition to verify the user's identity against the data stored in the chip in travellers' biometric passports.

The system can be used by the following passport holders, aged 12 and over.

1 – Including all classes of British nationality.

After a non-EU/EEA citizen clears the e-gate, a border police performs the final verification and affixes a passport stamp.

Czech Republic
Easy Go enables self-service passport clearance for flights.

Citizens of the European Economic Area and Switzerland, who are biometric passport holders  over 15, can use Easy Go.

Prague Airport was the first airport in Central and Eastern Europe to offer its passengers an automatic passport control at the E-Gate. It can be used by passengers arriving in Terminal 1 and is based on the German EasyPASS border control system

Denmark
Copenhagen Airport has installed self-service passport control at the beginning of Pier C.

The automated passport control e-gates can be used by European Economic Area or Swiss citizens aged 18 or over.

Finland
The automated border control system is operated by the Finnish Border Guard and is based on the biometric identification of passengers. A real-life picture is taken to compare individual facial dimensions with the photograph held on the chip in the passport. Passengers travelling with an infant or with a wheelchair still need to choose the manual border control line.

The Finnish Border Guard will implement automated border checks for all nationalities.

Helsinki Airport has dozens of automated passport machines. These can be used by travellers who have an e-passport (biometric passport). 
 Citizens of EU, EEA, Switzerland, Japan and South Korea can use the passport machines at arrival and departure.
 Citizens of the US, UK, Canada, Australia and New Zealand can use the passport machines whenever they are departing.

France
PARAFE gates are operated by the direction centrale de la police aux frontières and located at immigration checkpoints at major French border controls and offer an alternative to using desks staffed by immigration officers. The gates used fingerprint technology and facial recognition to verify the user's identity against the data stored in the chip in travellers' biometric passports. Facial recognition gates have replaced finger recognition gates. Facial recognition is now confirmed as available at all Parafe-hosting border controls.

Citizens from the European Economic Area, Andorra, Australia, Canada, Japan, Monaco, New Zealand, San Marino, Singapore, South Korea, Switzerland, United Kingdom and United States can use the Parafe gates, provided that they are aged 18 and over and holding valid biometric passports. Minors aged 12+ holding EEA/Swiss biometric passports can also use the Parafe gates on arrival, but not on departure.

For the finger recognition gates, French, Luxembourg, Belgian and German passport holders were pre-registered, while other passports had to go to a border police officer for registration. While the online documentation has not been updated, at least some other European passports work without pre-registration. It is known that German passports work without pre-registration. German passports, like French passports (but unlike British passports), have fingerprint information encrypted in the passport chip. Other EEA/Swiss passports with fingerprint information encrypted in the passport chip might work as well.

Parafe gates are available at the following locations:
 Paris Orly 
 Paris Charles de Gaulle 
 Bordeaux–Mérignac Airport
 EuroAirport Basel Mulhouse Freiburg
 Lyon Airport
 Marseille Provence Airport
 Nice Côte d'Azur Airport 
 Eurostar Paris Gare du Nord Terminal (juxtaposed controls)
 Eurostar London St Pancras Terminal (juxtaposed controls)
 Eurotunnel Calais Terminal (juxtaposed controls)
 Eurotunnel Folkestone Terminal (juxtaposed controls)

Germany

EasyPASS border control system - This is available for passengers over 18 (at most airports) with European Union and European Economic Area and Switzerland e-Passports . Additionally, USA, Hong Kong SAR, and Republic of Korea passport holders can register to use the system.
Since 2018 at Munich Airport and Frankfurt Airport, a trial operation enables third-country nationals to use EasyPass on leaving the EU. Munich Airport enables travellers from Australia, Brazil, Chile, Israel, Japan, Canada, Republic of Korea, Monaco, New Zealand and the US while Frankfurt enables travellers from Australia, Canada, Chile, Japan, Singapore, Republic of Korea, Taiwan, New Zealand, UAE and the US.
EasyPASS is available at:
Berlin Brandenburg Airport
Cologne/Bonn Airport
Düsseldorf Airport
Frankfurt Airport - Passengers aged 12+ can use the gates.
Hamburg Airport
Munich Airport - Passengers aged 12+ can use the gates.

Hungary
Automated Gates are available at Passport Controls at some of Hungary's border crossings. The system involves a passport and facial scan. The system is open to passengers over 18 with European biometric passports or national identity cards.

Ireland
The Irish Naturalisation and Immigration Service operates eGates at Dublin Airport for arrivals at Terminal 1 (Piers 1 and 2) and Terminal 2. They are currently available to citizens of the European Union, European Economic Area states and Switzerland with electronic passports aged 18 or over.

Further, citizens of Australia, Canada, Japan, New Zealand and the United States aged 18 or over with electronic passports can use the eGates in the Flight Connections Area of Dublin Airport if they are in transit with an onward flight to a destination outside the Common Travel Area.

There are proposals to extend the service to non-European citizens. Irish Passport Cards can,  be used.

Italy

ePassport gates are operated by the Polizia di Frontiera and located at selected immigration checkpoints in non-Schengen arrival and departure halls in some airports across Italy, offering an alternative to using desks staffed by immigration officers. The gates use facial recognition technology to verify the user's identity against the data stored in the chip in their biometric passport. The eGates do not accept national identity cards.

The system can be used by the following passport holders, aged 14 and over.

1 – only for those holding a passport with National ID number.
2 – for holders of British passports, only British citizens are eligible.

However all Non-EU citizens, after a successful eGate crossing, will still be referred to a border force agent that makes the final entry decision and stamps the passport.

At present, eGates are available at sixteen international airports:

In the near future, eGates will be available in Palermo Airport.

Luxembourg
In July 2018 at Luxembourg Airport, five ABC gates were installed at passport control at departures and another five at passport control at arrivals. Passengers who are over 18 and hold a biometric EU, EFTA, Andorra, Monaco or San Marino passport may use the ABC gates.

Netherlands 
The Netherlands Marechaussee has rolled out e-gates in the Netherlands over the past few years. They work by scanning facial information from the passport and, using facial recognition the image on the chip is compared to an image captured of the traveller. Currently, there are there are 78 eGates at Amsterdam Airport Schiphol. They are located in the arrival, departure and transfer areas.

The e-gates require the use of a biometric passport.

On arrival, the e-gates can be used by European Union, European Economic Area and Swiss citizens aged 16 and over.

On departure, the following citizens, aged 16 and over may use the e-gates:

For non-EU citizens, the passports will be manually stamped by a border official after using the gates.

Norway
The EasyPass system was introduced in 2012. Two automated self-service passport control units were put in place, designed in collaboration with the National Police Directorate.

Oslo Airport was the first in Norway to implement self-service passport control. Initially only Norwegian passport holders were eligible. In the autumn of 2017, eight new e-gates were installed for departing passengers, and during 2017, twelve were installed on arrival.

Norwegian and European Economic Area citizens can use the ePassport gates, provided that they are aged 18 and over and hold a valid biometric passport.

Portugal
RAPID4ALL e-gates are available at Lisbon Airport Terminal 1, Faro Airport, Madeira Airport and Porto Airport. 

On arrival, the RAPID4ALL e-gates can be used by travellers aged 18 and over holding a valid biometric passport from the European Economic Area, as well as the following non-EU countries:

On departure, the RAPID4ALL e-gates can be used by travellers aged 18 and over holding a valid biometric passport from the European Economic Area, as well as the following non-EU countries (provided that they entered the Schengen Area through Portugal):

After a non-EU/EEA citizen clears the e-gate, a border police performs the final verification and affixes a passport stamp.

Romania 
Romania installed their first e-gates in March 2021. The ABC gates can be used by citizens of the European Economic Area and Switzerland who hold a biometric travel document (passport or identity card) and are over 18 years old. 

The gates check people's travel documents, by comparing the facial image from the electronic chip of the passport/identity card with the one captured from the person physically present at the border control, to carry out the process of identification. The gates are connected to the Information System of the Border Police and allow checks to be carried out by querying the databases and access to the relevant operative information.

Currently, they are only available at Bucharest's Henri Coanda International Airport. There are 6 e-gates for departing passengers but the Romanian Border Police intends to install up to 24 e-passport gates at Henri Coanda International Airport. The Romanian Border Police also intends to install e-gates throughout other airports in Romania in the future.

Spain
At some Spanish borders, Automated Border Control (ABC) is available to all European citizens over 18 with EPassports at immigration halls, operated by the Spanish National Police. They come in either a gate, kiosk and gate, or mantrap kiosk configuration.

In the gate configuration, a passenger places their passport on a reader, looks at a camera and walks through a set of barriers. Finger scans are sometimes taken depending on the type of gate. Spanish Airports are replacing original kiosk/mantrap gates with these from providers such as Minsait and Everis. These gates also enable departing passengers to use them.

In the kiosk and gate configuration, a passenger approaches a kiosk for a facial, finger and passport scan. They then proceed to a set of doors and pass through using their fingerprint.

In the mantrap kiosk configuration, a passenger walks through a first set of barriers to a kiosk for a facial, finger and passport scan. They then proceed out through a second set of barriers.

Automated Border Control is available at the following locations:

Port of Algeciras 
Alicante Airport
Barcelona Airport 
Girona Airport 
Ibiza Airport
La Linea de la Concepción 
Madrid Airport 
Málaga Airport
Menorca Airport
Palma de Mallorca Airport 
Tenerife South Airport

Switzerland

Automated passport controls were introduced at Zürich Airport in May 2018. Passengers over 18 who are holders of biometric passports issued by Switzerland, European Union or European Economic Area member states are eligible to use them.

Rest of Europe

United Kingdom

ePassport gates are operated by the UK Border Force and located at immigration checkpoints in arrival halls in some airports across the United Kingdom, offering an alternative to using desks staffed by immigration officers. The gates use facial recognition technology to verify the user's identity against the data stored in the chip in their biometric passport. The ePassport gates do not accept national identity cards.

Citizens with European Economic Area, European Union, Swiss, Australian, Canadian, Japanese, New Zealand, Singaporean, South Korean, and United States passports can use ePassport gates, provided that they are aged either 12 or over and holding valid biometric passports. Users between the ages of 12 and 17 who are using ePassport gates are required to be accompanied by an adult.

Holders of valid biometric passports from Andorra, Argentina, Bahamas, Belize, Botswana, Brazil, Brunei Darussalam, Chile, Costa Rica, El Salvador, Guatemala, Vatican City State, Honduras, Hong Kong Special Administrative Region, Israel, Macao Special Administrative Region, Malaysia, Maldives, Mexico, Monaco, Namibia, Nauru, Nicaragua, Panama, Papua New Guinea, Paraguay, Samoa, Seychelles, Saint Vincent and the Grenadines, Taiwan (passport must have a personal identification number), Tonga, Trinidad and Tobago, Uruguay can use ePassport gates, provided that they are aged 12 or over and are already enrolled as a "Registered Traveller".

ePassport gates are available at the following locations:
 Birmingham Airport
 Bristol Airport
 Cardiff Airport
 East Midlands Airport
 Edinburgh Airport
 Eurostar Brussels-Midi Terminal (juxtaposed controls)
 Eurostar Paris Gare du Nord (juxtaposed controls)
 Eurostar St Pancras Terminal (juxtaposed controls)
 Gatwick Airport (North and South Terminals)
 Glasgow Airport
 Heathrow Airport (Terminals 2, 3, 4 and 5)†
 London City Airport
 Luton Airport
 Manchester Airport (Terminals 1, 2 and 3)
 Newcastle Airport
 Stansted Airport
† Heathrow Airport Terminal 1 became obsolete on 29 June 2015.

Serbia
The automated passport control was introduced to Belgrade Nikola Tesla Airport back in December 2010 as a donation of the German company Millbauer. Only Serbian passports are eligible for use. As of now, there is still only one gate and only at arrivals immigration (as everyone, including Serbian citizens, receives an exit stamp on departure) and no further development was announced.

Turkey 
Automated Passport Control gates, called "Hızlı Pasaport Geçiş Sistemi" (Expedited Passport-Entry System) was introduced first in Istanbul's Sabiha Gökçen Airport in May 2019, quickly followed by the newly opened Istanbul Airport in June 2019. Turkish Citizens with a valid, chipped biometric Turkish passport (both old and new chipped-models are accepted) are eligible to use the automated gates, which require passengers to scan their passports and fingerprints, as well as using a facial-recognition system by taking a live photograph of the passenger. In the departure immigration checkpoints, a Turkish Border Police will check the departure tax stamp/card ("Harç Pulu") for Turkish citizens. Receiving an exit or entry stamp is optional for Turkish citizens.

Hong Kong

Hong Kong's e-Channels are situated at all border crossing points. A person who holds a Hong Kong Identity Card (HKID) inserts the card into a slot to enter the first eGate and then has their thumbprint scanned to pass through the second eGate.

The Automated Passenger Clearance System was introduced by the Hong Kong Immigration Department in 2004 and designed to speed up border immigration processes for residents of Hong Kong, Macau and frequent visitors to Hong Kong entering and exiting the territory whether it be by land, air or sea via the use of self-service kiosks employed at various border control points.

Eligibility
 A Hong Kong permanent resident aged 11 or above (using a smart identity card) 
 A Hong Kong resident aged 11 or above holding a Document of Identity for Visa Purposes (using a smart identity card and carrying a valid Document of Identity for Visa Purposes)
 A person aged 11 or above who has the right to land or is on unconditional stay in Hong Kong (using a smart identity card)
 A non-permanent resident issued with a notification label (using a smart identity card and carrying a valid travel document)
 A registered cross-boundary primary school student under the age of 11 (using the enrolled valid travel document)
 A registered frequent visitor aged 18 or above (using the enrolled valid travel document)
 A registered Macau permanent resident aged 11 or above (using a Macau permanent identity card)
 A registered Republic of Korea citizen aged 17 or above and enrolled under Smart Entry Service (SES) scheme (using the Republic of Korea Passport valid for at least 6 months and having no adverse record in the HKSAR)
An enrolled holder of a Republic of Singapore Passport aged 11 or above (using a Republic of Singapore Passport valid for at least 6 months, completed 2 trips in past 24 months and having no adverse record in the HKSAR)
An enrolled holder of a Federal Republic of Germany Passport aged 18 or above (using a Federal Republic of Germany Passport valid for at least 6 months and having no adverse record in the HKSAR)
An enrolled holder of an Australian Passport aged 16 or above (using an Australian Passport valid for at least 6 months and having no adverse record in the HKSAR)

The user upon entrance to the e-Channel inserts his Hong Kong Identity Card into the card reader (which reads the embedded chip) or places his registered travel document or Macau Identity Card onto the document reader. The channel gate will open, the user takes his Hong Kong identity card or registered travel document or Macau Identity Card and steps in and the gate will close. Thumb or finger is then placed onto the fingerprint reader, once identity has been confirmed, another set of gates in front open allowing exit. If an issue arises and identity cannot be confirmed or a malfunction occurs, an immigration supervisor will be on hand to assist.

Locations

First made available on 16 December 2004 in Lo Wu Control Point, over the past several years the locations have expanded to include:

Hong Kong International Airport
Lo Wu Control Point
Lok Ma Chau Control Point 
Lok Ma Chau Spur Line Control Point
Man Kam To Control Point
Sha Tau Kok Control Point
Shenzhen Bay Control Point
Hong Kong–Zhuhai–Macau Bridge
Hung Hom station
West Kowloon station
Hong Kong China Ferry Terminal
Hong Kong–Macau Ferry Terminal
Kai Tak Cruise Terminal
Tuen Mun Ferry Terminal

By allowing registered users to use the self-service kiosks to pass through Hong Kong immigration, processing time averages around 12 seconds making E-channels far more efficient than traditional immigration counters.

Macau residents
Since its first inception where only Right to Abode Hong Kong Permanent Identity Card holders were permitted to use the self-service kiosks, the program expanded on 12 September 2006; allowing not only those of Right to Land or those with unconditional stay in Hong Kong but also to those residents and non-residents with notification labels to use the E-Channels.

The program was expanded further again on 10 December 2009 to allow holders of Macau Resident Identity Card to register for and use of the Hong Kong E-channels to enter and exit the territory.

Border cities to Hong Kong on Mainland China's side such as Shenzhen have E-Channels for use of the Home Return Permit cards.

Frequent Visitor Automated Passenger Clearance
Frequent visitors to Hong Kong as well as Macau Resident Card holders can register for Frequent Visitor Automated Passenger Clearance.

A valid travel document with a multiple visit visa (if applicable), plus one of the following documents is needed:

 A valid HKSAR Travel Pass or
 An APEC Business Travel Card with the economy code ‘HKG’ or
 Hong Kong International Airport Frequent Visitor Card or
 Frequent Flyer Programme Membership Card issued by an airline which has joined this arrangement (please enquire with your airline).

e-Channel Service for foreign nationals
The Frequent Visitor program was further expanded to nationals of the following countries. Such arrangements are reciprocal and eligible Hong Kong Special Administrative Region passport holders may also enrol for the respective automated border clearance schemes under these countries:
 Republic of Korea enrolled under Smart Entry Service (SES) scheme (Since 16 December 2013)
 Singapore (Since 22 September 2014)
 Germany (Since 1 November 2014)
 Australia (Since 20 June 2016)
 Thailand (Since 15 September 2018)

One Stop Customs and Immigration clearance
A special vehicular E-Channel has been erected for Shenzhen Bay known as One Stop Customs and Immigration Clearance for goods vehicle passing through the Shenzhen Bay Control Point, indicating how versatile this system is, and an asset for the Hong Kong Immigration Department.

Japan
Japan's J-BIS Biounit is an immigration control system that was introduced into Japanese airports and located at immigration booths. Fingerprints of both index fingers are collected along with a photograph. At the same time, the person is checked against immigration office lists, and criminals, people who were previously deported, and other punished foreigners are prevented from entering Japan. On 20 November 2007, Narita Airport, Kansai International Airport, and Chūbu Centrair International Airport had the system, with plans to roll out the system to the 27 airports and 126 harbours in Japan.

Until the start of J-BIS, when people would land in Japan and apply for entry, it was difficult to tell which people had changed their names or used special names on their passports, had been deported, or had criminal records. After the events of 9/11, Japan amended its Immigration Control and Refugee Recognition Act.

On 20 November 2007, the changes to the act went into effect. Most foreigners (everyone except special permanent residents, diplomats, people who were invited by the government, and people under the age of 16) were now required to have fingerprints taken from their two index fingers, as well as a photograph. The J-BIS system was the second system of its type enacted in the world; the first was the United States's US-VISIT system.

The fingerprint scans and photographs are transferred from the airport to the immigration office's servers, and this information is compared against a blacklist in around five seconds.

This list is a collection of Interpol information and around 14,000 people that have been searched by Japanese police, as well as the fingerprints and pictures that were recorded from around 800,000 foreigners who were deported from Japan. According to the immigration office, it is predicted that 0.001% of people who enter Japan appear on the blacklist.

Since the introduction of the system, 846 people received exclusion orders by immigration authorities and 8 people were arrested for fabricating their fingerprints. The Japan Coast Guard also reported that the number of smugglers crossing the Korea Strait from the Korean peninsula has increased rapidly.

Along with the introduction of J-BIS, an "Automated gate" (自動化ゲート) was set up at Terminal 1 and 2 at Narita Airport, Haneda Airport, Chubu Centrair Airport and Kansai Airport. With this system, when a person enters or leaves Japan, rather than having to be processed by a human examiner there, a person can use an eGate, thereby making both entry and departure simpler and easier, as well as more convenient. Japanese people with valid passports, foreigners with both valid passports (this includes refugees with valid travel certificates and re-entry permits) and re-entry permits can use this system.

The gate works by holding up the identification page of the passport up to the terminal in front of the transparent booth, and the entrance to the booth will open. Inside the booth, there is an equipment to read fingerprints, where prints from two fingers are taken. After confirmation of identity, the exit gate will open. Although there is a worker sitting at the gate, according to the Ministry of Justice immigration office's information guide to the automated gates, most Japanese should be able to use the automated gate. When the automated gate is used, passports are not stamped. When an entry stamp is needed, officials are available near the gate to stamp passports; alternatively, one can use the regular gate.

To use Japanese eGates, prior registration is required. For details, see the Ministry of Justice immigration office's information guide. For this advance registration, Japanese people (those who hold Japanese passports), only fingerprints are needed (not an image), as the automated gate does not take a picture.

Macau
Macau uses the same E-Channel system as Hong Kong. Hong Kong ID Card holders can register. Border cities to Macau on Mainland China's side such as Zhuhai have E-Channels which process Home Return Permit cards.

Malaysia
Malaysia was the first country in the world to issue biometric passports in 1998. As such, it was among the first to adopt the use of an automated border control system to facilitate immigration clearance for Malaysian citizens. The Autogate system is available at most immigration checkpoints for all Malaysian passport holders. The system uses facial recognition and thumbprint verification to match against information stored in the traveller's biometric passport.

Foreign residents with Malaysian long-term passes may register to use the e-Gate system at Kuala Lumpur International Airport.

At the two road border checkpoints with Singapore, MBIKE is open to registered Malaysian motorcyclists, using an RFID sticker in the registered user's passport. The Malaysia Automated Clearance System (MACS) can be used by registered Singapore citizens, Singapore permanent residents and foreigners residing in Singapore. However, registration for the MACS scheme has been suspended since August 2018, although existing registered users may continue to use automated clearance until the expiration of their MACS stickers.

Mexico
Mexico's Viajero Confiable program is only open to Mexican and US citizens who are members of Global Entry.
It is a Western Hemisphere Travel Initiative (WHTI) program and prospective members must pass a background check, interview with a Mexican immigration officer, and have fingerprints and iris scans taken. Kiosks are currently available at the Cancun, Los Cabos, and Mexico City international airports, but the Mexican government hopes to expand it to other cities in the near future.

New Zealand
New Zealand also operates the Australian manufactured SmartGate system (renamed as eGates) at Auckland, Wellington, Christchurch and Queenstown airports, but with a more limited list of eligible passports than in Australia: only ePassports issued by New Zealand, Australia, China (excluding Hong Kong SAR), Canada, France, Germany, Ireland, Japan, The Netherlands, Singapore, South Korea, the United Kingdom and the United States can be used.

eGates can only be used by travellers 12 years of age or older. (Customs is conducting a trial, in conjunction with other border agencies, about whether to lower the age of eligibility to use eGate for people with an eligible ePassport from 12 years of age to 10 years of age.)

New Zealand eGates use biometrics to match the stored image in the ePassport with the picture of the user taken at the gate.

To make sure eGate can do this, travellers must make sure they look as similar to their ePassport photos as possible and remove veils, scarves and hats that obscures any part of the face. Glasses may be left in place if worn in the ePassport photo and they have thin frames. eGate can handle minor changes in your face, for example if the travellers' weight or hair has changed.

Customs, Biosecurity and Immigration officials will use information provided at eGates, including photos, to clear travellers and their items across New Zealand's border.

Biometric information is kept for three months before destruction but other information, including about movements across New Zealand's border is kept indefinitely and handled in accordance with the Privacy Act 1993, or as the law authorises. This might include information being used by or shared with other law enforcement or border control authorities.

Singapore
The Immigration and Checkpoints Authority of Singapore (ICA) has integrated information technology to streamline the entry and exit procedure at checkpoints. Singapore citizens, permanent residents and other registered travellers can use automated lanes called enhanced-Immigration Automated Clearance System (eIACS). Foreign visitors whose fingerprints are registered on arrival may use the eIACS lanes for exit clearance. The Biometric Identification of Motorbikers (BIKES) System at land checkpoints can be used by residents and work pass holders entering and leaving Singapore by motorcycle.

The Frequent Traveller Programme (FTP) allows eligible travellers to enjoy convenient immigration clearance via the eIACS automated clearance facilities. APEC Business Travel Card (ABTC) holders or visitors who have visited at least 2 times within the last 24 months, from certain eligible countries, are able to apply. Eligible countries or regions include Australia, Japan, Malaysia, South Korea, United Kingdom (“British Citizen” only), New Zealand, Thailand, People's Republic of China (with prior approval of 5-year, multiple-entry visas and Hong Kong SAR passport) and the United States (for citizens who are existing members of the U.S. Global Entry Programme (GEP)), with age variations depending on the type of nationality.

In 2016, ICA began the biometric registering and verification of travellers using the Bioscreen system. Singapore citizens and Permanent Residents have their iris bio-data registered as well.

In 2019, ICA began trialing using the facial and iris recognition as an upgrade to the current fingerprint recognition at various land and air border checkpoints.

In May 2022, ICA announced that from the second half of this year, foreign travellers who have enrolled their facial and iris biometrics on their initial visit to Singapore will be able to obtain automated immigration clearance on subsequent trips to Singapore. Known as the Automated Clearance Initiative (ACI), no separate registration is required; travellers will be notified on their eligibility to use the automated lanes at the passenger halls and motorcycle lanes on departure and subsequent trips to Singapore upon successful enrolment at the immigration counters. Travellers are required to provide a valid email address within their SG Arrival card submissions in order to receive their Electronic Visit Pass (e-Pass) when using the automated lanes; travellers will not be issued an arrival immigration endorsement in their passports. The ACI is available to the following passport holders (aged 6 and over):

1 – Only for Mainland Chinese citizens holding a 5 year Multiple Journey Visa (MJV). 2 – Only British citizens are eligible for enrollment.

In 2022, ICA also announced that from 2023, all travellers will be able to use automated lanes upon arrival in Singapore for faster immigration clearance; the ICA noting that "the use of iris patterns and facial features as primary identifiers for immigration clearance not only provides more robust and reliable identity authentication of travellers, but (also) more hygienic, convenient and efficient immigration clearance".

ICA also announced in the future, Singapore residents - either departing or arriving - will be able to clear immigration entirely with iris and thumbprint verification, without presenting their passports.

South Korea
South Korea's Smart Entry Service (SeS) is a voluntary program that allows pre-approved and trusted travellers to proceed through South Korean immigration using biometric information included in their passports at eGates. Typically this takes less than 12 seconds.

Eligible applicants register their fingerprints and facial image in advance and must agree to the use of their registered personal information.

South Koreans aged 7 or above, citizens from selected countries, foreigners aged 17 or above and holding Korean Alien Registration Card, foreign crew members with multiple-entry visas, and foreigners holding Korea Priority Card issued by Ministry of Justice are eligible. Foreign nationalities eligible to register include American citizens enrolled in Global Entry, Hong Kong SAR passport holders, Macau SAR passport holders, and Taiwanese passport holders. The nationals must not hold Korean Alien Registration Card. For Hong Kong, Macau, and Taiwan passport holders, they must not use other passports such as People's Republic of China passport, British National (Overseas) passport, and Portuguese passport when they enter South Korea to be eligible.

Taiwan
Taiwan's eGate is a free automated entry system for Taiwanese citizens and certain classes of residents and frequent visitors. Users simply scan their travel documents at the gate and are passed through for facial recognition. Electronic fingerprinting is used when facial recognition fails. Registration is available at the immigration counter right at the port of entry.

Thailand
Thailand's automated passport control (APC) system at Suvarnabhumi Airport and Don Mueang International Airport has been available for Thai nationals since 2012. Holders of Hong Kong SAR and Singapore ePassports can also use the automated passport control gates.

United Arab Emirates
The UAE's Smart Gate system allows UAE nationals, UAE residents, GCC nationals, and passport holders of certain counties to arrive and depart the country without the need to see an immigration officer. The process takes 30 seconds.

United States

U.S. citizens, U.S. lawful permanent residents, Canadian citizens, Canadian permanent residents, eligible Visa Waiver Program travellers and passengers holding a B1/B2, C1/D, or D visa are eligible to use a system called Automated Passport Control (APC) for free without having to pre-register.

Besides APC, certain low-risk travellers can also apply to enroll in trusted Trusted Traveler Programs operated by U.S. Customs and Border Protection, such as Global Entry and NEXUS. Applicants must file an application, pay a registration fee, go through a background check and attend an interview. Once approved, in addition to using self-service kiosks just like APC, travellers may receive additional benefits such as TSA PreCheck.

Global Entry 

Global Entry is a program of the U.S. Customs and Border Protection service that allows pre-approved, low-risk travellers to receive expedited clearance upon arrival into the United States.

Qatar
E-Gate is a program that allows Qatari national, expatriate citizens of Qatar and GCC national to apply for an e-gate card by visiting the Ministry of Interior office in Al Gharafa (Doha).

See also
 Iris Recognition Immigration System
Port Passenger Accelerated Service System (PORTPASS)
Secure Electronic Network for Travelers Rapid Inspection (SENTRI)
Airport of Entry
Port of entry

References

External links
 Australian Border Force: SmartGate
gov.uk: Use ePassport gates for fast entry into the UK
US Automated Passport control
SG Automated Lanes at the Passenger Halls

Biometrics
Expedited border crossing schemes
Biometric databases